

Premier League
 FC Armavir are promoted, but withdrew before the start of the season.
 Araks are promoted to replace FC Armavir.
 Spartak Yerevan was dissolved and the players moved to Banants.

First League
 Newly created FC Vagharshapat are introduced to the league.
 FC Dinamo Yerevan and Yerazank FC returned to professional football.
 Spartak Yerevan FC merged with FC Banants and was dropped to the First League as a result.

External links
 RSSSF: Armenia 2003